Phaeosolenia is a genus of fungi in the family Chromocyphellaceae. The genus contain eight species from South America.

See also
List of Agaricales genera

References

Agaricales
Agaricales genera